Ask Dad is a 1929 American Pre-Code film directed by Hugh Faulcon and starring Edward Everett Horton and Winston Miller.

Cast
 Edward Everett Horton as Dad
 Winston Miller as Tommy
 Ruth Renick as Miss Grace Wilson

External links
 
 

1929 films
Educational Pictures short films
1920s English-language films
American black-and-white films
1929 comedy films
Silent American comedy films
American comedy short films
1920s American films